Javier Golovchenko (born 12 March 1974) is a Uruguayan swimmer. He competed in two events at the 1996 Summer Olympics.

References

1974 births
Living people
Uruguayan male swimmers
Olympic swimmers of Uruguay
Swimmers at the 1996 Summer Olympics
Place of birth missing (living people)